= City of London Archaeological Society =

The City of London Archaeological Society (COLAS) was founded in 1966 "to encourage interest and engagement in British archaeology, particularly in the heart of London and its ancient environs." The society is a registered charity.
